The 1975 Major League Baseball season saw Frank Robinson become the first black manager in the Major Leagues. He managed the Cleveland Indians.

At the All-Star Break, there were discussions of Bowie Kuhn's reappointment. Charlie Finley, New York owner George Steinbrenner and Baltimore owner Jerry Hoffberger were part of a group that wanted him gone. Finley was trying to convince the new owner of the Texas Rangers Brad Corbett that MLB needed a more dynamic commissioner. During the vote, Baltimore and New York decided to vote in favour of the commissioner's reappointment. In addition, there were discussions of expansion for 1977, with Seattle and Washington, D.C. as the proposed cities for expansion.

Standings

American League

National League

Postseason

Bracket

Awards and honors
Baseball Hall of Fame
Earl Averill
Bucky Harris
Billy Herman
Judy Johnson
Ralph Kiner
Most Valuable Player
Fred Lynn (AL) Boston Red Sox
Joe Morgan (NL) Cincinnati Reds
Cy Young Award
Jim Palmer (AL) Baltimore Orioles
Tom Seaver (NL) New York Mets
Rookie of the Year
Fred Lynn (AL) Boston Red Sox
John Montefusco (NL) San Francisco Giants
Gold Glove Award
George Scott (1B) (AL) 
Bobby Grich (2B) (AL) 
Brooks Robinson (3B) (AL) 
Mark Belanger (SS) (AL) 
Paul Blair (OF) (AL) 
Fred Lynn (OF) (AL) 
Joe Rudi (OF) (AL)
Thurman Munson (C) (AL) 
Jim Kaat (P) (AL)

Statistical leaders

Home field attendance

Notable events
 August 14 - Atlanta Braves pitcher Phil Niekro hits the only triple of his Major League career, off the pitching of Lynn McGlothen of the St. Louis Cardinals.

References

External links
1975 Major League Baseball season schedule at Baseball Reference

 
Major League Baseball seasons